Nio liv is a 1998 studio album by Sven-Ingvars.

Track listing
Intro / P. Jonsson
Nio liv / S. Carlsson, P. Gessle
Gör det igen / D. Hylander
Mannen före mej / P. LeMarc
Byter bara blickar / P. Gessle
Brunetten i Brunskog / N. Strömstedt
Trubbel # 2 / P. Jonsson
Älskar du mig / P. Bäckman, S.-E. Magnusson
Det kommer från hjärtat / P. Fransson, P. Karlsson
Då mår jag riktigt bra / P. LeMarc
Du är så olik / S. Hellstrand
Min vän Johanna / N. Hellberg
Bara för din skull / P. Jonsson
Därför viskar jag ditt namn / N. Hellberg
Hoppa in i min bil / N. Hellberg
Marie, Marie / P. Gessle, D. Alvin

Charts

References 

1998 albums
Sven-Ingvars albums